Bobby Ware Is Missing is a 1955 American crime film directed by Thomas Carr and written by Daniel B. Ullman. The film stars Neville Brand, Arthur Franz, Jean Willes, Walter Reed, Paul Picerni and Kim Charney. The film was released on October 23, 1955, by Allied Artists Pictures.

Plot

Cast          
Neville Brand as Lt. Andy Flynn
Arthur Franz as George Ware
Jean Willes as Janet Ware
Walter Reed as Max Goodwin
Paul Picerni as Alfred Gledhill
Kim Charney as Bobby Ware
Thorpe Whiteman as Mickey Goodwin
Peter Leeds as MacKay

References

External links
 

1955 films
American crime films
1955 crime films
Allied Artists films
Films directed by Thomas Carr
1950s English-language films
1950s American films
American black-and-white films